The Hundwiler Höhi (1,306 m) is a mountain of the Appenzell Alps, located on the border between the Swiss cantons of Appenzell Ausserrhoden and Appenzell Innerrhoden. It is situated between Hundwil and Gonten.

The summit is easily accessible from every side of the mountain and is a popular vantage point over the Säntis, the Alpstein massif and Lake Constance. A mountain hut is located near the top.

References

External links

Hundwiler Höhi on Hikr

Mountains of the Alps
Mountains of Switzerland
Mountains of Appenzell Ausserrhoden
Mountains of Appenzell Innerrhoden
Appenzell Alps
One-thousanders of Switzerland
Appenzell Ausserrhoden–Appenzell Innerrhoden border